William Walsh, Irish soldier and officer, fl. 1605-1616. 

Captain Walsh was from Galway. He was awarded a commission in 1605 after recruiting sixty soldiers in Ireland at his own expense. Significantly, the majority of levies among Irish exiles that year were conducted by Old English captains. Walsh was wounded in 1616 while in the service of Colonel John O'Neill. He is listed in Priests in Ireland and Gentlemen gone abroad, written c. 1618.

External links

 http://www.ucc.ie/celt/published/T100077/index.html

Irish soldiers in the Spanish Army
17th-century Irish people
People from County Galway
People of Elizabethan Ireland